Frans van Schooten Jr. also rendered as Franciscus van Schooten (15 May 1615, Leiden – 29 May 1660, Leiden) was a Dutch mathematician who is most known for popularizing the analytic geometry of René Descartes.

Life
Van Schooten's father,  was a professor of mathematics at the University of Leiden, having Christiaan Huygens, Johann van Waveren Hudde, and René de Sluze as students.

Van Schooten met Descartes in 1632 and read his Géométrie (an appendix to his Discours de la méthode) while it was still unpublished. Finding it hard to understand, he went to France to study the works of other important mathematicians of his time, such as François Viète and Pierre de Fermat. When Frans van Schooten returned to his home in Leiden in 1646, he inherited his father's position and one of his most important pupils, Huygens.

The pendant marriage portraits of him and his wife Margrieta Wijnants were painted by Rembrandt and are kept in the National Gallery of Art:

Work

Van Schooten's 1649 Latin translation of and commentary on Descartes' Géométrie was valuable in that it made the work comprehensible to the broader mathematical community, and thus was responsible for the spread of analytic geometry to the world. 

Over the next decade he enlisted the aid of other mathematicians of the time, de Beaune, Hudde, Heuraet, de Witt and expanded the commentaries to two volumes, published in 1659 and 1661. This edition and its extensive commentaries was far more influential than the 1649 edition. It was this edition that Gottfried Leibniz and Isaac Newton knew.

Van Schooten was one of the first to suggest, in exercises published in 1657, that these ideas be extended to three-dimensional space. Van Schooten's efforts also made Leiden the centre of the mathematical community for a short period in the middle of the seventeenth century.

In elementary geometry Van Schooten's theorem is named after him.

References

 Some Contemporaries of Descartes, Fermat, Pascal and Huygens: Van Schooten, based on W. W. Rouse Ball's A Short Account of the History of Mathematics (4th edition, 1908)

External links
 Mathematische Oeffeningen van Frans van Schooten 
Biografisch Woordenboek van Nederlandse Wiskundigen: Frans van Schooten 
Frans van Schooten, and his Ruler Constructions at Convergence
 
An e-textbook developed from Frans van Schooten 1646 by dbook

1615 births
1660 deaths
17th-century Dutch mathematicians
People from Leiden
Leiden University alumni
Academic staff of Leiden University